The Center for European Studies at Sciences Po is one of the nine research centres at the IEP de Paris. It is founded in 2005, by Renaud Dehousse, who is its director.

Research institutes in France
Political science organizations
Sciences Po